Javoor is a village in Dharwad district of Karnataka, India.

Demographics 
As of the 2011 Census of India there were 386 households in Javoor and a total population of 2,117 consisting of 1,089 males and 1,028 females. There were 314 children ages 0-6.

References

Villages in Dharwad district